Abaciscus intractabilis is a species of moth belonging to the family Geometridae. It was described by Francis Walker in 1864. It is known from Borneo, Peninsular Malaysia and Sumatra.

Its wings are a dark black with dull yellow flecks and dots. The species is nocturnal.

References

Boarmiini
Moths described in 1864
Moths of Asia